The Queen's Nursing Institute Scotland (QNIS) is a charity which promotes high quality community nursing. Based in Edinburgh, the body was founded in 1889 with the opening of the small Central Training Home at North Charlotte Street. Due to the high demand for training for district nurses, the QNIS soon moved (in 1890) to the grand premises at Castle Street, where it remains.

The original title Queen's Nurse was reintroduced in 2017, to be awarded to leaders in clinical excellence in the fields of community-based, registered nursing, midwifery and health visiting.

The founding charter states the goal of the organisation, still applicable today:
"The training support and maintenance of women to act as nurses for the sick poor and the establishment (if thought proper) of a home or homes for nurses and generally the promotion and provision of improved means of nursing the sick poor."

See also
NHS Scotland
Scotland's Gardens

References

External links
Official website

1888 establishments in Scotland
Poverty in Scotland
Nursing organisations in the United Kingdom
Charities based in Edinburgh
Organizations established in 1888
Community nursing
Medical and health organisations based in Scotland
Public health in the United Kingdom
Vocational education in Scotland
Educational qualifications in Scotland
Qualification awarding bodies in the United Kingdom
Welfare in Scotland
Social care in Scotland